Strictly Dishonorable can refer to:

 Strictly Dishonorable (play), a 1929 Broadway hit written by Preston Sturges
 Strictly Dishonorable (1931 film), the first film adaptation of the play, starring Paul Lukas and Sidney Fox
 Strictly Dishonorable (1951 film), the second film adaptation of the play, with music, starring Ezio Pinza and Janet Leigh